Julia Ivonchyk ( Kovalenko, born 27 July 1994) is a Belarusian female acrobatic gymnast. With partners Angelina Sandovich and Yuliya Ramanenka, Kovalenko achieved 5th in the 2014 Acrobatic Gymnastics World Championships.

At the 2013 World Games, she won a bronze medal in the group event.

At the 2017 World Games, she won a silver medal in the women's group all-around event.

At the 2017 Acrobatic Gymnastics European Championships, she won bronze medals in three women's group events: all-around, balance, and dynamic.

At the 2018 Acrobatic Gymnastics World Championships, she won a bronze medal in the team event.

References

External links 

 
 

1994 births
Living people
Belarusian acrobatic gymnasts
Female acrobatic gymnasts
World Games silver medalists
Competitors at the 2017 World Games
European Games medalists in gymnastics
European Games bronze medalists for Belarus
Gymnasts at the 2019 European Games
Medalists at the Acrobatic Gymnastics World Championships
21st-century Belarusian women